Skora is a river of Poland, a tributary of the Czarna Woda. Known in German as the Schnelle Deichsa, it flows through the Legnica and Złotoryja districts, with its source in the foothills of Kaczawskiego. Towns along the river include Pielgrzymkę, Wojcieszyn, Uniejowice, Zagrodno, Modlikowice, Jadwisin, Osetnicę, Konradówkę, Chojnów, Goliszów and Niedźwiedzice i Grzymalin. It then enters the Czarna Woda. On its journey, it flows through the Sądreckich hills, where it merges with the Czermnicy River.

Fauna
The upper Skora abounds in trout, graylings, and minnow. Further downstream, chub, perch and barbels are found.

Gallery

References

Rivers of Poland
Rivers of Lower Silesian Voivodeship